3.. 6.. 9 Seconds of Light was Belle & Sebastian's third EP, released in 1997 on Jeepster Records. The lead track on the EP, "A Century of Fakers," uses the same backing track as "A Century of Elvis" from Lazy Line Painter Jane. Another song, "Songs for Children" (sometimes known as "On the Radio") plays directly after "Put the Book Back on the Shelf" (on the same track) on both the CD and 12" versions of this release. The front cover features band member Stuart Murdoch with Victoria Morton. The EP was later re-packaged as part of the Lazy Line Painter Jane box-set, and all four tracks were collected on the Push Barman to Open Old Wounds compilation. Both NME and Melody Maker made the release their Single of the Week, and the EP became the band's first to reach the UK top 40 singles chart, peaking at #32.

Track listing
Source: Jeepster Records, Belle & Sebastian Official Site

Release details
 CD (JPRCDS003)
 12" vinyl (JPR12003)
 7" vinyl (JPR7003)

References

Belle and Sebastian EPs
1997 EPs
Jeepster Records EPs